Nakarin Atiratphuvapat (born 17 January 1996) is a Thai motorcycle racer.

Career
He was an Asia Talent Cup contestant in 2014 and finished the season 8th overall. He remained in the Asia Talent Cup for 2015 and finished the season 4th overall.

Career statistics

Asia Talent Cup

Races by year
(key) (Races in bold indicate pole position; races in italics indicate fastest lap)

FIM CEV Moto3 Junior World Championship

Races by year
(key)

Grand Prix motorcycle racing

By season

Races by year
(key) (Races in bold indicate pole position; races in italics indicate fastest lap)

ARRC Supersports 600 Championship

Races by year
(key) (Races in bold indicate pole position; races in italics indicate fastest lap)

References

External links

1996 births
Living people
Nakarin Atiratphuvapat
Moto3 World Championship riders
Nakarin Atiratphuvapat
Nakarin Atiratphuvapat